Franklin Township is one of the eighteen townships of Monroe County, Ohio, United States. As of the 2010 census, the population was 427, including 81 people in the village of Stafford.

Geography
Located in the western part of the county, it borders the following townships:
Seneca Township - north
Summit Township - northeast
Wayne Township - east
Washington Township - southeast
Bethel Township - south
Elk Township, Noble County - southwest
Stock Township, Noble County - west
Marion Township, Noble County - northwest corner

The village of Stafford lies in southwestern Franklin Township.

Name and history
It is one of twenty-one Franklin Townships statewide.

Government
The township is governed by a three-member board of trustees, who are elected in November of odd-numbered years to a four-year term beginning on the following January 1. Two are elected in the year after the presidential election and one is elected in the year before it. There is also an elected township fiscal officer, who serves a four-year term beginning on April 1 of the year after the election, which is held in November of the year before the presidential election. Vacancies in the fiscal officership or on the board of trustees are filled by the remaining trustees.

References

External links
County website

Townships in Monroe County, Ohio
Townships in Ohio